The Himalayan Geothermal Belt (HGB) is a region that extends for  through India, Tibet, Yunnan, Myanmar and Thailand, and that contains many geothermal fields.

Location

The Himalayan Geothermal Belt was formed as a result of the collision of the Indian Plate with the Eurasian Plate, which created the Himalayas.
The HGB has an extension to the westward that shows in warm or hot springs in the Peshawar region of Pakistan. 
These are clustered along the Main Karakoram Thrust, Main Mantle Thrust and Main Central Thrust.
Some authors consider that the belt extends yet further west and should be called the Mediterranean-Himalayan Geothermal Belt.

Mechanisms

These may be interpreted as segments of slip lines caused by deformation of the ductile crust in the Asian tectonic plate.
In the eastern Himalayas the heat bands transfer two to three times as much heat as in the western Himalayas. 
This may be due to the Indian plate rotating in a counter-clockwise direction as it penetrates the Asian plate.
The thermal waters in Tibet were thought to be meteoric in origin, and the heat source to be decaying radioactive nuclides. 
Due to studies in the 1990s and deep drilling results it is now thought that the heat source is granite that has remelted to magma due to the collision of the plates.

It is not clear whether the circulation of deep groundwater in this region is driven by topography or by tectonic lateral stress.

Commercial potential

More than 150 of the geothermal fields have the potential to generate energy.
There is a binary plant in Thailand that generates 300 kWe from 117 degrees C water.
The Yangbajain Geothermal Field is in the Lhasa-Gangdise terrane.
It is in an active part of a slip-fault zone of the Nyainqentanglha Mountains and fractured Himalayan granite. 
The first 1 MWe turbine came into operation in September 1977, and capacity had been increased to 25.18 MWe by 1991.
As of 2007 another 7 MWe was being generated by seven small plants in Tibet and Yunnan.

References

Sources

Geothermal energy
Geology of China